John Allen Knight (November 8, 1931 – February 2, 2009) was a minister in the Church of the Nazarene, general superintendent in the Church of the Nazarene, president of Mount Vernon Nazarene College (1972–1975), and editor of the Herald of Holiness, now known as Holiness Today (1975–1976). He was born in Mineral Wells, Texas and died at the age of 77 while on vacation in Daytona Beach, Florida. The John A. & Justine A. Knight Scholarship Fund at Southern Nazarene University is named for him and his wife.

References

External links
 (birthdate incorrect in header, but correct in text) and also here with photo

1931 births
2009 deaths
American Nazarene ministers
Arminian ministers
Nazarene General Superintendents
People from Mineral Wells, Texas
Clergy from Oklahoma City
Presidents of Mount Vernon Nazarene University
Southern Nazarene University alumni
University of Oklahoma alumni
Vanderbilt University alumni